Agency for International Development v. Alliance for Open Society International, Inc., 570 U.S. 205 (2013), also known as Alliance for Open Society I (to distinguish it from the 2020 case), was a United States Supreme Court decision in which the court ruled that conditions imposed on recipients of certain federal grants amounted to a restriction of freedom of speech and violated the First Amendment.

Facts 
In 2003, the United States Congress passed and President George W. Bush signed a law providing federal government funds to private groups to help fight AIDS and other diseases all over the world, through the United States Agency for International Development (USAID). However, one of the conditions imposed by the law on grant recipients was a requirement, known as the anti-prostitution pledge, to have "a policy explicitly opposing prostitution and sex trafficking". Many AIDS agencies preferred to remain neutral on prostitution so as not to alienate the sex workers they work with to reduce HIV rates.

DKT International filed a lawsuit in Washington, DC but the challenge to the law was defeated on appeal.  Alliance for Open Society International and Pathfinder International filed another suit in 2005. In 2008, InterAction, and the Global Health Council joined the suit against the provision in a federal court in New York City, arguing that the requirement to promote a specific message violated the First Amendment's protection of free speech. The district court judge ruled in their favor, and the provision has effectively been blocked since. On appeal, the Second Circuit Court upheld the judge's decision.

Decision 
In November 2012, the Supreme Court granted a petition for certiorari filed by USAID, the U.S. Department of Health and Human Services, and the Center for Disease Control. In a 6–2 decision, the court ruled in a majority written by Chief Justice John Roberts that the government cannot force a private organization to publicly profess a viewpoint that mirrors the government's view but is not held by the organization itself. Such a requirement would be considered a form of "leveraging" and violated the First Amendment protection of free speech. Justices Antonin Scalia and Clarence Thomas jointly filed a dissenting opinion arguing that the majority's ruling would prevent government funding for specific ideological programs.

Later case 
While the U.S. government subsequently did not hold American NGOs to the Policy Requirement for funding, it continues to require foreign affiliates of these NGOs to the requirement. A new set of lawsuits on this action began, and while the case upheld the Supreme Court ruling, the Supreme Court ruled in a 5–3 decision in Agency for Int’l Development v. Alliance for Open Society in 2020 that the foreign affiliates were considered separate non-American entities of the American NGOs, and thus did not enjoy the First Amendment freedom of speech protections rights in this case.

See also
List of United States Supreme Court cases involving the First Amendment
List of United States Supreme Court cases, volume 570
2012 term United States Supreme Court opinions of John Roberts

References

External links
 

United States Supreme Court cases
United States Supreme Court cases of the Roberts Court
2013 in United States case law
United States Free Speech Clause case law
United States Agency for International Development
Prostitution law in the United States
History of HIV/AIDS